Superconnected may refer to:

"Superconnected", a song by Broken Social Scene from Broken Social Scene
"Super-Connected", a song by Belly from King
Superconnected: The Internet, Digital Media and Techno-Social Life, a book by Mary Chayko
Superconnectivity, a concept in graph theory